Rasharkin United Football Club were an intermediate-level football club who played in the Premier division of the Ballymena & Provincial League in Northern Ireland. The team played in the league for 13 seasons until they disbanded in 2012.

External links
 nifootball.co.uk - (For fixtures, results and tables of all Northern Ireland amateur football leagues)

Association football clubs in Northern Ireland
Association football clubs in County Antrim
2012 disestablishments in Northern Ireland
Association football clubs disestablished in 2012